The Premier of North West is the  head of government of the North West province of South Africa. The current Premier of the North West is Bushy Maape, a member of the African National Congress, who was elected premier in September 2021 after the resignation of Job Mokgoro.

Functions
In terms specified by the constitution, the executive authority of a province is vested in the Premier. The Premier appoints an Executive Council made up of ten members of the provincial legislature; they are called Members of the Executive Council (MECs). The MECs are practically ministers and the Executive Council a cabinet at the provincial level. The Premier has the ability to appoint and dismiss MECs at his/her own discretion.

The Premier and the Executive Council are responsible for implementing provincial legislation, along with any national legislation assigned to the province. They set provincial policy and regulate the departments of the provincial government; their actions are subject to the national constitution.

In order for an act of the provincial legislature to become law, the Premier must sign it. If he/she believes that the act is unconstitutional, it can be referred back to the legislature for reconsideration. If the Premier and the legislature cannot agree, the act must be referred to the Constitutional Court for final consideration.

The Premier is also ex officio a member of the National Council of Provinces, the upper house of Parliament, as one of the special delegates from the province.

List of Premiers of North West

Election
The election for the North West Provincial Legislature is held every five years, simultaneously with the election of the National Assembly; the last such election occurred on 8 May 2019. At the first meeting of the provincial legislature after an election, the members choose the Premier from amongst themselves. The provincial legislature can force the Premier to resign by a motion of no confidence. If the Premiership becomes vacant (for whatever reason) the provincial legislature must choose a new Premier to serve out the period until the next election. One person cannot have served more than two five-year terms as Premier; however, when a Premier is chosen to fill a vacancy the time until the next election does not count as a term.

See also
 Politics of North West (South African province)
 Premier (South Africa)
 President of South Africa
 Politics of South Africa

References

External links
Official website

 
Government of North West (South African province)